South Dakota Dept. of Transportation Bridge No. 16-570-054 in rural Corson County, South Dakota was listed on the National Register of Historic Places in 1993.

It brings a local road over Oak Creek near McLaughlin, South Dakota.

It is a small rural bridge in Corson County, South Dakota.  It is a pony truss bridge with king post trusses built by Western Bridge & Construction Co. in 1911.

References

		
Infrastructure completed in 1911
National Register of Historic Places in Corson County, South Dakota
Bridges in South Dakota